The following is a list of Non-Summit cast members, past and present.

Summit leaders

Current representatives

Former representatives

Visiting intern representatives

Season 1

Notes

References

Cast
Lists of entertainers
Lists of television personalities